Ania Tarnowska, known professionally as I Ya Toyah, is a Chicago, USA musician, singer, composer, producer, performer, and the founder/CEO of Femme Fatale Records label. Her music incorporates elements of multiple genres including industrial, electro-industrial, goth electro, punk electro, electronic rock, and synthwave. It best fits in the alternative music category.

She began releasing her music independently in 2018, with 4 single releases, followed by her self-recorded and self-produced debut album, Code Blue. In 2019, she released 5 singles, participated in many collaborations, became a member of post-industrial supergroup, The Joy Thieves and toured excessively with bands such as Pigface and Zwaremachine. In 2020, she released 2 singles and a double album of remixes titled Code Blue Reloaded plus bonus album Code Blue Revelations. In 2021 Out of Order - a 5 chapters E.P. consisting of five singles and music videos came out in both digital and physical forms. 2022 brought I Ya Toyah on the US East Coast Tour, and marked her first acoustic EP release Ghosts.

When spoken out loud in Polish, I Ya Toyah means “It’s Just Me.” Her logo art merges the symbols for peace and anarchy that symbolizes her “rebel psyche.”

History 
Born and raised in Lódz, Poland, Ania began her music education as a child, studying classical guitar, piano, vocal performance, and music theory. She moved to the United States as a young adult, and soon became a part of multiple musical projects, performing with metal, punk rock jazz, and prog rock bands in prominent venues across the US.

In 2016, she graduated as the valedictorian from SAE Institute, where she focused on Music Business and Audio Engineering. In 2017, she began working at her home studio on her solo project, I Ya Toyah, and her debut album, Code Blue, was released independently on Oct. 26th, 2018. True to her motto, she spent the majority of 2019 “spreading the disease of music and infecting the human race” by touring.

In 2020, she was scheduled to tour the US and Canada as direct support for Stabbing Westward, but it was postponed, due to the COVID-19 pandemic. The lockdown was spent creating new material for her EP, Out Of Order, and collaborating with various artists. In February / March 2022 I Ya Toyah embarked on an East Coast US Tour, promoting her new material in live settings.

Remixes 
I Ya Toyah's music has been remixed by artists, including Skold (Marilyn Manson, Shotgun Messiah, KMFDM, Motionless in White), Gopal Metro (the co-founder of the Gothic Rock band, Bella Morte),  Rhys Fulber (Front Line Assembly, Conjure One), Adoration Destroyed, and The Joy Thieves (See full discography below.)

Collaborations 
In 2019 I Ya Toyah recorded music with artists such as Julian Beeston (Nitzer Ebb, Cubanate), Max Fox (Zwaremachine), Indign, and Traumabond. That year she also became a member of The Joy Thieves, a post-industrial super group that includes current, former, and touring members of bands such as Ministry, Revolting Cocks, Pigface, Marilyn Manson, Stabbing Westward, Nitzer Ebb, KMFDM, My Life With the Thrill Kill Kult, Blue October, 16VOLT, and more.

In March 2020, she also started working as a composer, alongside movie director, Ralph Klisiewicz, creating the score for a short film called The Artifact.

Social awareness and causes 
As a suicide loss survivor, I Ya Toyah advocates for the importance of mental wellness, and ending the stigma that surrounds mental illness.  During her live performances, she often talks about mental health with her audience, communicating the significance of breaking the stigma. Her ‘Code Blue’ album focuses on mental health and suicide prevention, and 15% of all proceeds go to the American Foundation for Suicide Prevention (AFSP). In July 2020, she organized an Art Auction for Mental Health During the Times of Pandemic. Artists from across the US created and donated art pieces that were inspired by her lyrical content, and all the proceeds aided the AFSP. In December 2022 I Ya Toyah released a self-funded line of suicide prevention and mental health wristbands promoting 988 Crisis Line, available for free with free shipping across the USA.

In April 2019, I Ya Toyah released a single and a video titled Forbidden Bark, which featured her dog, Benek. The release was used as a platform to raise awareness for charity organizations that focus on fighting animal cruelty. Benek was featured again in May 2022 as I Ya Toyah performed a live streamed show during Goths For Sanctuaries Festival raising money for animal sanctuaries around the world.

In 2020, her song Funeral for Love was selected to be a part of ESA (Electronic Saviors: Industrial Music to Cure Cancer) compilation released by Metropolis Records/Distortion Productions. This version of the song, featuring Traumabond appeared on this release, alongside bands such as Ego Likeness, The Clay People, Leæther Strip, Angelspit, <PIG>, Die Warzau, Caustic, God Module, Skatenigs, and Cyanotic.  

In Spring 2022 I Ya Toyah participated in the recording of a version of the Beatles’ classic Come Together to raise funds for the people of the war-torn country of Ukraine. The project named Lifeline International was arranged and mixed by legendary music producer John Fryer, who has worked with such seminal bands as Nine Inch Nails, Depeche Mode, and Cocteau Twins. Participants included members of Faith No More, Stabbing Westward, Ministry, Rammstein, Filter, THE HARDKISS, The Joy Thieves, Agnostic Front, Basement Jaxx, and more.

Discography

Singles 
 Code Blue - 2018
 Farewell - Mirrors Don’t Lie - 2018
 Funeral For Love - 2018
 Glass Eyes - 2018
 Funeral For Love (remix by Gopal Metro Invasion) -2019
 Forbidden Bark (feat. Benek the Dog) - 2019
 Flashback (remix by Rhys Fulber) - 2019
 Puppet (remix by Adoration Destroyed) - 2019
 Glass Eyes (remix by The Joy Thieves) - 2019
 Motion (remix by Skold) - 2020
 It’s No Good (cover of Depeche Mode) - 2020
Out of Order - 2021
Concrete - 2021
Pray - 2021
Death's Kiss - 2021
Vast Spaces - 2021
Pray (remix by Stabbing Westward) - 2021
Vast Spaces (remix by The Joy Thieves) - 2022
Code Blue (acoustic) - 2022
Pray (acoustic) - 2022
Time Machine (acoustic) - 2022

Albums and EPs 
 Code Blue - 2018
 Code Blue Reloaded (remix album) - 2020
 Code Blue Revelations (bonus remix album) - 2020
Out of Order - 2021
Ghosts (acoustic EP) - 2022

Collaborative releases and compilations 
 Smile That Killed the Country (with Max Fox of Zwaremachine) - 2019
 Cities in Dust (with The Joy Thieves) - 2019
 Autumn Storm (with Indign) - 2020
 Electronic Saviors: Funeral for Love feat.Traumabond ( Metropolis Records) - 2020
Tiny Gods Who Walk Beside Us - 2020
Tear Down The Walls: A Riveting Tribute To Pink Floyd's The Wall (Riveting Music) with The Joy Thieves - 2020
The Unquiet Grave (Cleopatra Records) - 2020
We The People (Featured by Julian Beeston) - 2021
Higher Than The Sun (Featured by Julian Beeston) - 2021
Crazy Horses (Featured by Julian Beeston) - 2021
Broken Hearts & Robot Parts, Volume II (COP International) - 2021
Follow The Leaders (A Killing Joke Tribute) by Coitus Interruptus Productions - Money is Not Out God with The Joy Thieves - 2021
Come Together (with Lifeline International) - 2022
Talkin' Bout The Wolf (with Jonathan/Christian) - 2022
Love is a Battlefield (with The Joy Thieves) - 2022

External links

References 

Living people
American musicians
Polish emigrants to the United States
Year of birth missing (living people)